Alton Meister (1922–1995) was an American biochemist who made pioneering contributions to the study of glutathione metabolism. 

Alton Meister was born in New York City to Morris Meister and Florence Glickstein Meister. He received an undergraduate degree from Harvard University and an MD from Cornell University Medical College (now Weill Cornell Medical College). He then moved to the National Cancer Institute at the National Institutes of Health in Bethesda, Maryland. He remained there until 1955 when he became Chairman of the Department of Biochemistry at Tufts University. Meister returned to Cornell University Medical College in 1967 and served as chairman of its biochemistry department until 1991. He died in 1995 at the age of 72.

References

American biochemists
1922 births
1995 deaths
Harvard University alumni
Weill Cornell Medical College alumni
Tufts University faculty
Weill Medical College of Cornell University faculty
Members of the National Academy of Medicine